Foden's may refer to:

 Foden Trucks, British truck and bus manufacturer
 Foden's Band, an English brass band
 Fodens Ladies F.C., former English women's football team